Roy Slater (born 15 May 1948) is a recurring character in the British sitcom Only Fools and Horses. He was played by Jim Broadbent, and in the prequel Rock and Chips, by Calum MacNab.

Only Fools and Horses

Background
Despite only making three on-screen appearances, Slater's background is revealed in detail during the course of the show's history.

As a child, Slater attempted to be part of Del Boy's gang at school as they used to sit next to each other in class; but he was always a loner, hated amongst his peers and infamous for his deceitful nature. Eventually, out of bitterness for the others' ostracising him, Slater joined the police force at the age of 18 and frequently engaged in unethical activity to try to frame and prosecute not just his old school friends but anyone possible – including his own family, as revealed in "May the Force Be with You".

His own ego would eventually turn him to crime: leading him into diamond smuggling, which is the main focus of the episode "To Hull and Back" and a strong part feature of the plot to "The Class of '62". His initial prosecution for diamond smuggling landed him a five-year prison sentence.

Del's domestic partner Raquel Turner is revealed to be Slater's ex-wife in "The Class of '62"; he was married to her for four years before separating. Throughout the show's history Raquel would frequently comment how nasty he could be as a husband.

"May the Force Be with You"
Slater is introduced in "May the Force Be with You", the fifth episode of series three, having recently been promoted to the position of Detective Inspector. He has returned to Peckham and is investigating the theft of a microwave oven which turns out to be connected to Del.

The personality of his character and specific details of his past are revealed in this episode, including his feud with his peers, his dishonest practices and his generally villainous behaviour. As well as the main characters making clear their thoughts and attitudes towards him, his own colleague PC Terry Hoskins reveals that even his peers in the police service reject him, and Slater admits during the episode to having arrested his own father in the past (for riding a bicycle with a defective rear light), alienating him from his family.

"To Hull and Back"
Slater is the main antagonist in "To Hull and Back", his involvement in crime is the main focus of the storyline, with the Trotters becoming involved in a diamond smuggling operation part-headed – unbeknownst to them – by Slater.

His position of authority within the police has been exploited a number of times to successfully smuggle diamonds into England, and over the course of the episode he almost succeeds again, only to be thwarted by Hoskins who drives him into a sting and lands Slater with a five-year prison sentence.

"The Class of '62"
Slater's final appearance in character was in "The Class of '62", in which he has been paroled from prison after three and a half years of his five-year sentence and returns to Peckham, setting up a school reunion to which Del, Boycie, Trigger, and Denzil are invited, with Rodney joining them.

Over the course of the episode, it is learnt that Del's girlfriend Raquel is Slater's ex-wife, and the school reunion was merely a set-up to gain contact with her regarding his divorce proceedings, as he knew from the start that she was living with Del. It is also revealed that Slater has returned to the illegal diamond trade, which Del and Rodney use to blackmail Slater into giving Raquel a fair divorce, no longer pestering her and leaving Peckham for good, under the threat of them informing the police about Slater's return to crime. This prompts Slater's departure from the series.

Slater appears once more in the series but not in a character appearance, in the final episode "Sleepless in Peckham" when Del and Rodney are given an old photograph of the very first Jolly Boys' outing from 1960, in which Slater is pictured. The first Jolly Boys' Outing forms part of the storyline of the prequel series Rock & Chips, which features a young Slater.

Rock & Chips 
A young Slater is shown in the prequel series Rock & Chips, played by Calum MacNab. Slater is initially shown as a prefect at school, trying to intimidate Del and his gang but ultimately being insulted by both the gang and his superiors from whom he attempts to gain friendship.

He is part of the first Jolly Boys' Outing as noted at the end of Sleepless in Peckham, in which he is tricked into taking drugs and passes out before they reach their destination. Over the course of the series he joins the police cadets and attempts to arrest Del and Jumbo Mills in the market for selling illegally imported records. He takes them to the station, only to be denied a bona fide arrest and ignored by his superior Sgt Foster, who also lets Del and Jumbo off with a warning and seizes their records.

Family tree

Sources
 May the Force be With You, Only Fools and Horses S03E05
 To Hull and Back, Only Fools and Horses Christmas special 1985
 The Class of '62, Only Fools and Horses S07E04
 Rock & Chips, Only Fools and Horses prequel series

References

Only Fools and Horses characters
Fictional British police detectives
Television characters introduced in 1983
Fictional smugglers
Male characters in television